The 2020–21 Dream11 Super Smash (named after the competition's sponsor Dream11) was the sixteenth season of the Men's Super Smash Twenty20 cricket tournament played in New Zealand. It started on 24 December 2020, and finished on 13 February 2021. The Wellington Firebirds were the defending champions.

On 15 June 2020, New Zealand Cricket announced the first round of contracts for domestic teams ahead of the 2020–21 season. The full schedule for the tournament was confirmed on 29 September 2020.

The Wellington Firebirds topped the group, advancing directly to the final. By the end of January 2021, the Canterbury Kings had secured their place in the Preliminary Final. On 5 February 2021, the Central Stags became the third and final team to reach the knock-out stage of the tournament, advancing to the Preliminary Final. In the Preliminary Final, the Canterbury Kings beat the Central Stags by four wickets to join the Wellington Firebirds in the final. In the final, the Wellington Firebirds beat the Canterbury Kings by five wickets to win the tournament.

Points table

 Advanced to the Final
 Advanced to the Preliminary Final

Fixtures

Round-robin

Finals

References

External links
 Series home at ESPN Cricinfo

2020–21 New Zealand cricket season
Super Smash
Super Smash (cricket)